Harlem History Club was a study circle founded in Harlem in the 1930s and based at the Harlem YMCA.

Participants included:
 John Henrik Clarke
 Willis Nathaniel Huggins
 John G. Jackson
 Joel A. Rogers
 Charles Seifort
 Richard B. Moore
 William Leo Hansberry
 Nnamdi Azikiwe
 Kwame Nkrumah

References

Harlem Renaissance